The 2001 Old Dominion 500 was the 30th stock car race of the 2001 NASCAR Winston Cup Series and the 53rd iteration of the event. The race was held on Monday, October 15, 2001, Martinsville, Virginia at Martinsville Speedway, a  permanent oval-shaped short track. The race took the scheduled 500 laps to complete. In the closing laps of the race, Ricky Craven, driving for PPI Motorsports, would manage to defend Robert Yates Racing driver Dale Jarrett in a close finish to win his first career NASCAR Winston Cup Series victory and his only victory of the season. To fill out the podium, Jarrett and Bill Davis Racing driver Ward Burton would finish second and third, respectively.

Background 

Martinsville Speedway is an NASCAR-owned stock car racing track located in Henry County, in Ridgeway, Virginia, just to the south of Martinsville. At 0.526 miles (0.847 km) in length, it is the shortest track in the NASCAR Cup Series. The track was also one of the first paved oval tracks in NASCAR, being built in 1947 by H. Clay Earles. It is also the only remaining race track that has been on the NASCAR circuit from its beginning in 1948.

Entry list 

 (R) denotes rookie driver.

Practice

First practice 
The first practice session was held on Friday, October 12, at 11:20 AM EST. The session would last for two hours.

Second practice 
The second practice session was held on Saturday, October 13, at 12:00 PM EST. The session would last for 45 minutes.

Third and final practice 
The final practice session, sometimes referred to as Happy Hour, was held on Saturday, October 13, at 1:15 PM EST. The session would last for 45 minutes.

During the session, Roush Racing driver Jeff Burton would wreck after Ricky Rudd sent oil onto the track, sending Burton into the outside turn 1 wall. Burton was forced to start at the rear for the race and transfer to a backup car.

Qualifying 
Qualifying was held on Friday, October 12, at 3:05 PM EST. Each driver would have two laps to set a fastest time; the fastest of the two would count as their official qualifying lap. Positions 1-36 would be decided on time, while positions 37-43 would be based on provisionals. Six spots are awarded by the use of provisionals based on owner's points. The seventh is awarded to a past champion who has not otherwise qualified for the race. If no past champ needs the provisional, the next team in the owner points will be awarded a provisional.

Three drivers would fail to qualify: Carl Long, Kyle Petty, and Frank Kimmel.

Full qualifying results

Race results

Notes

References 

2001 NASCAR Winston Cup Series
NASCAR races at Martinsville Speedway
October 2001 sports events in the United States
2001 in sports in Virginia